David Anthony Pirner (born April 16, 1964) is an American songwriter, singer, and producer best known as the lead vocalist and frontman for the alternative rock band Soul Asylum.

Early life and work
Pirner was born in Green Bay, Wisconsin and graduated from Minneapolis West High School in 1982. He taught himself how to play the drums. By age 20, Pirner started his career drumming with a punk band called Loud Fast Rules as part of the Minneapolis scene, together with Karl Mueller (bass) and Dan Murphy (guitar). When Pirner switched to singing and playing rhythm guitar, Pat Morley joined on drums. Morley was later replaced by Grant Young, and the band changed their name to Soul Asylum. After touring the United States for a number of years they gathered a cult following of fans, but did not quite reach commercial visibility. Pirner at the time was the band's songwriter and he produced the album, Coup De Grace, by the Minneapolis metal band the Coup de Grace in 1990.

Commercial success
The band achieved commercial success and visibility on MTV and VH1 with the 1993 single "Runaway Train", followed by another hit song, "Black Gold"; both from their album Grave Dancers Union. As Soul Asylum grew in popularity, Pirner was seen guesting on albums of differing genres, including artists like Paul Westerberg, Jason Karaban, Mike Watt, The Autumn Defense and Victoria Williams. His disheveled appearance and blonde matted dreadlocks made an unmistakable impression on fans and critics alike, making Pirner easily recognized and associating the band with the grunge scene.

By 1999, Soul Asylum went into hiatus after making their eighth album Candy from a Stranger (1998), which sold the fewest copies of the three albums most recently released at that point (after Grave Dancers Union and Let Your Dim Light Shine (1995), which yielded the big hits "Misery" and "Just Like Anyone"). After four years, Soul Asylum reunited and started writing songs in the studio. Bassist Karl Mueller died on June 17, 2005, at the age of 42 from esophageal cancer. About a year after his death, Soul Asylum released The Silver Lining on Legacy Recordings, which was dedicated to Mueller. About half the songs on the album were recorded with the late bassist, such as "Lately", "Slowly Rising" and "Standing Water". The first hit from this album was "Stand Up And Be Strong". Soul Asylum toured with their new line-up, which consisted of Pirner on guitar and vocals, Dan Murphy on lead guitar, Michael Bland on drums and Tommy Stinson on bass (as well as John Fields standing in on bass and piano for Mueller). A few years later, on July 17, 2012, Soul Asylum released an album titled Delayed Reaction. In 2016, the band released Change Of Fortune and in 2020 released Hurry Up And Wait.

Pirner had a small role in the film Reality Bites in 1994.  He was also part of the all-star band assembled for the soundtrack of the 1994 film Backbeat. Pirner also contributed to the soundtrack of Kevin Smith's 1997 film Chasing Amy with an instrumental song called "Tube Of Wonderful". There are two songs by the band Soul Asylum featured in the film: "Lucky One" and "We 3". Pirner also composed the incidental music for the film. The song "Can't Even Tell" is featured in Smith's Clerks, and Smith used "Misery" in the sequel, Clerks II.

In 2002 Pirner released his first solo album entitled Faces & Names on Ultimatum Music. He also contributed guest vocals on the song "Chillout Tent" in The Hold Steady's 2006 release, Boys and Girls in America. In 2020 he released the book Loud Fast Words: Soul Asylum Collected Lyrics and when the pandemic stopped the tour Soul Asylum was making for their new album, Pirner and the band's guitar player Ryan Smith played 100 original songs on weekly Facebook streams that were called The Quarantine Sessions.

Personal life 
Pirner started dating actress Winona Ryder after the pair were introduced at Soul Asylum's performance on MTV Unplugged in 1993. They broke up three years later.

Pirner lived in Bywater, New Orleans, Louisiana for a time and still maintains a residence and recording studio in New Orleans. He also maintains a residence in Minneapolis. He has a son, Eli, with his ex-wife.

Discography

Solo
2002: Faces & Names (Ultimatum Music)

Guest appearances
2006: The Hold Steady – "Chillout Tent" (Boys and Girls in America)
2014: Within Temptation – "Whole World Is Watching" (Hydra)

References

Bibliography

External links

Dave Pirner at MinneWiki
 The Soul Asylum  Band Files are available for research use at the Minnesota Historical Society.
Career Retrospective Interview from February 2016 with Pods & Sods

1964 births
Living people
American male singers
American rock drummers
Grammy Award winners
Musicians from Minneapolis
Columbia Records artists
Singers from Minnesota
20th-century American drummers
American male drummers
Soul Asylum members
20th-century American male musicians
American baritones